Ronald John Baker (March 28, 1912 – March 24, 1990) was a pioneering Canadian engineer.

References
 Oswald, Mary, They Led the Way, Wetaskiwin: Canada's Aviation Hall of Fame, 1999.

External links
Hall of Fame site

1912 births
1990 deaths